Bryan Joachim Malessa (born May 16, 1964, in Chagrin Falls, Ohio) is an American novelist. He is a graduate of the University of California, Berkeley (BA), the Oscar Wilde Centre at Trinity College, Dublin, and College of the Redwoods (CR). (MPhil). He lives in greater Los Angeles.

Novels

The Flight 

In reviewing The Flight (Harper Perennial), set on the Eastern Front (World War II), The Irish Times stated "With this story...Bryan Malessa joins the ranks of [Nobel Laureate] Günter Grass, Rachel Seiffert and others in taking on the major preoccupations of post-war German literature...and the role of literature in history and memory."

The War Room 

In Financial Times, Mark Simpson wrote "Billed as 'an epic investigation into America's underbelly,' The War Room has a Catcher in the Rye quality to it, but without the toxicity."

Other works 

His story "Looking Out For Hope" (Voices of the Xiled, Doubleday, 1994) in memory of Raymond Carver was made into a short film directed by Phil Harder and scored by the rock band Low.

He is also editor of Re/mapping the Occident (University of California, 1995) and a journalist whose best-known piece is a widely cited career retrospective interview “Once Was King” with World Champion and three-time Tour de France winner Greg LeMond.

Sources
The Irish Times, Escape From East Prussia
http://www.irishtimes.com/newspaper/weekend/2007/0407/1175720887682.html
The Independent (UK) review of The Flight

Financial Times “The War Room” http://www.ft.com/cms/s/2/327918e4-3563-11e0-aa6c-00144feabdc0.html#axzz1EHYut8eX
Bryan Malessa, "Once Was King: An interview with Greg LeMond" 
http://www.roble.net/marquis/coaching/lemond98.html

1964 births
Living people
21st-century American novelists
American male novelists
University of California, Berkeley alumni
Alumni of Trinity College Dublin
Writers from California
Writers from Montana
Novelists from Ohio
People from Chagrin Falls, Ohio
21st-century American male writers